Wad Madani Stadium is a multi-use stadium in Wad Medani, Sudan.  It is currently used mostly for football matches and is the home stadium of Ittihad Wad Medani,  Al Ahly Wad Medani and Jazeerat Alfeel. The stadium has a capacity of 15,000 people. It hosted several matches during the 1970 African Nations Cup in Sudan.

External links
Profile's stadium - goalzz.com

Wad